Simo is a municipality located in the province of Lapland, Finland, about  from the Swedish border.

In 2001, Simo's debt per capita was 946.39 Euros.

Simo's three largest neighbouring towns are Oulu ( inhabitants), Kemi ( inhabitants) and Tornio ( inhabitants). Some of the bigger neighbouring municipalities are Keminmaa ( inhabitants) and Ii ( inhabitants).

History

Early history 
The oldest residential areas of Simo are the Simonkylä and Maksniemi regions. The oldest records of human habitation within Simo is found in the village of Simonkylä, which was occupied during the 1300s. In the 1500s the population of Simo began to grow as a result of migration, the population increased especially in the villages of Simonkylä and Simoniemi. Simo was known for its large farms and fishermen.

Development over the course of time 
In the 1800s the population gradually began to expand along the beaches of the Simojoki river. In the year of 1865, a large municipal reform occurred in which the municipality, named Simo, received its actual borders, even though the area had long been referred to as Simo and the residents as simolaiset.

Lapland War 
During the Lapland War, the village of Maksniemi suffered serious damage. Bridges along the Simojoki river were blown up by the German forces, which is why for quite some time after the war Simojoki had to be crossed by ferry. The destruction of the connection that the bridges provided was important as it cut off the municipality of Simo from Finnish Highway Four.

Geography 
Simo is situated by the Bothnian Bay, at the mouth of river Simojoki. In Simo there is a rural landscape and also in the planning of the centre an attempt has been made to emphasise the nature vicinity. Simo consists of many small and vital village communities. Simo's sights include Simo's Church which was completed in 1846 during the late Empire time and light infantryman place with its statues which will be a memory from the war of independence when the route goes through Simo's wildernesses.

Islands 
Islands within Simo are inclusive of:

 Haahka
 Halttari
 Harvakari
 Härkäletto
 Junkiletto
 Koivuluoto
 Korkiakari
 Kuralanletto
 Laitakari
 Lammasletto
 Leipäre
 Leipäreenkrunni
 Lissabon
 Louekari
 Montaja
 Munakari
 Möyly
 Oravainen
 Paavonletto
 Palokarinletto
 Paskaletto
 Pensasletot
 Peurankallio
 Pihlajakari
 Pikku-Leipäre
 Pirttisaari
 Rajaletto
 Saapaskari
 Selkäkari
 Selkäkarinmatala
 Tiuranen
 Tiurasenkalla
 Tiurasenkrunni
 Tynttyrit
 Vatunki
 Ykskivi
 Ööperit

Villages 
The villages of Simo are inclusive of:

 Alaniemi
 Asemakylä
 Hamari
 Karisuvanto
 Koivuoja
 Maksniemi
 Malininperä
 Matala
 Ojalanperä
 Onkalonperä
 Patokoski
 Pömiö
 Simoniemi
 Simonkylä
 Siperianperä
 Soikko
 Taininiemi
 Viantie
 Ylikärppä

Economy 
In Simo there is no industry. In 2007–2011, Fennovoima considered to build a 1,500 to 2,500 megawatt nuclear power plant in Karsikko and Laitakari. However,  Fennovoima announced in October 2011 that the power plant would be built at Pyhäjoki.

Education 
Simo has three elementary schools, one secondary school and a high school. The nearest university is in Oulu.

Notable individuals 
 Aarne Orjatsalo, actor
 Esko Tavia, Mayor of Simo from 2002 - 2015
 Juha Marttila, MTK chairman
 Martti Miettunen, Minister of State, three times Prime Minister
 Matti Lackman, Ph.D, principal investigator and philosopher
 Seppo Lohi, Doctor of Theology
 Tuomas Lohi, Mayor of Kempele
 Veikko Huovinen, writer (born in Simo)

References

External links 

 Municipality of Simo – Official website

 
Populated coastal places in Finland
Populated places established in 1608
1608 establishments in Sweden